The British Academy Video Games Award for Performer is an award presented annually by the British Academy of Film and Television Arts (BAFTA) in honor of the best performance featured in a game "from voice artistry through to motion capture".

The award was first given at the 8th British Academy Video Games Awards ceremony in 2012, with Mark Hamill winning for his performance as the Joker in Batman: Arkham City. The performer with the most awards is Ashley Johnson with two, one each for her portrayal of Ellie in both The Last of Us and The Last of Us: Left Behind. Troy Baker has received the most nominations with five, twice for his work as Joel Miller in The Last of Us series and once each for Pagan Min in Far Cry 4, Sam Drake in Uncharted 4: A Thief's End, and Higgs in Death Stranding.

Since 2019, the award has been split into "Performer in a Leading Role" and "Performer in a Supporting Role".

Winners and nominees

In the following table, the years are listed as per BAFTA convention, and generally correspond to the year of game release in the United Kingdom.

Multiple wins and nominations

The following performers received two or more awards:

The following performers received two or more nominations:

The following series received two or more awards:

The following series received two or more nominations:

References

External links
British Academy Video Games Awards official website

Performer
Awards for video game performances